The Trinidad motmot (Momotus bahamensis) is a colorful near-passerine bird endemic to the forests and woodlands of Trinidad and Tobago.  This species and the blue-capped motmot, Lesson's motmot, whooping motmot, Amazonian motmot, and Andean motmot were all considered conspecific. Though found on both islands, this bird is more abundant in Tobago than it is in Trinidad.

The central crown is black and surrounded by a blue band. There is a black eyemask. The call is a low owl-like ooo-doot.

These birds often sit still, and in their dense forest habitat can be difficult to see, despite their size. They eat small prey such as insects, spiders, earthworms, lizards, small snakes and fledgling birds, and will also regularly take fruit. They are known to eat small tree snails, and to use forest floor rocks as 'anvils' to crack open the hard shells of these prey items to access the soft edible bodies within.

Like most of the Coraciiformes, motmots nest in tunnels in banks, laying about three or four white eggs.

The bird is shown on the front of the $5 bank note of Trinidad and Tobago.

References

External links

Trinidad motmot
Birds of Trinidad and Tobago
Endemic fauna of Trinidad and Tobago
Trinidad motmot